Kenneth Lee Chastain (born October 15, 1964, Hanover, New Hampshire) is a musician, engineer, and producer currently living in Minneapolis, Minnesota. He is featured on percussion on Ziggy Marley's Love Is My Religion album and many other well-known artists' works. Chastain also composes, produces, engineers, and mixes for TV and film projects, most notably the movie Sweet Land.

History 
Chastain was born in New Hampshire, and lived in France and Morocco with his Peace Corps parents before moving to Minnesota. He played Suzuki cello and was a soloist in the Metropolitan Boys Choir in the Twin Cities. He went on to the University of Minnesota and the Berklee College of Music in Boston to study music, audio engineering and film scoring.

He plays bass, guitar, keyboards, trumpet, harmonica, Chapman Stick, theremin, and percussion.

Pixel Farm 
As head of audio post-production at Pixel Farm Minneapolis, and chief engineer and composer for Pixel Farm Music, Ken Chastain scores music, sound designs, and mixes award-winning television commercials and films. Recent award-winning commercials include Garmin's Super Bowl XLII offering “Napoleon” and United Airlines' "Dragon".

Commercials for: Porsche / Goodyear / Purina / Coca-Cola / Garmin / Best Buy / Target / BMW / United Airlines

Film credits:
Sweet Land (Winner, Best First Feature Spirit Award for Independent Film)
Older Than America (Premiered at SXSW and the Walker Art Center “Women of Vision”
Funkytown
Pathfinder
Urban Explorers
Tromeo and Juliet
Detective Fiction
Hotel Hidajet 

In the music world Chastain can be heard playing on records from Switchfoot and Mike Doughty to Grammy Award-winning Ziggy Marley.

Music credits: Ziggy Marley / Dan Wilson / Mandy Moore / Mike Doughty / Clay Aiken / Andrew W.K. / Pink / Backstreet Boys / Semisonic / Glen Phillips  / Switchfoot

Appearances: The Tonight Show NBC / The Larry Sanders Show HBO / South by Southwest / Sundance Film Festival

Miscellaneous: 
NBA theme songs for the Detroit Pistons and Cleveland Cavaliers
Weisman Art Museum installation “Voyager”

Discography

References

External links 
https://web.archive.org/web/20071228055756/http://findarticles.com/p/articles/mi_m0HNN/is_6_17/ai_88249641
Pixel Farm
Pixel Farm Music
https://web.archive.org/web/20080608093039/http://www.terramara.com/history/index.html
http://www.imdb.com/name/nm0153947/

1964 births
Living people
Record producers from New Hampshire
People from Hanover, New Hampshire
Record producers from Minnesota
Musicians from Minneapolis
University of Minnesota alumni
Berklee College of Music alumni